Setora Takaboeva (born 8 August 2001) is an Uzbekistani footballer who plays as a midfielder for Trabzonspor  in Turkey, and the Uzbekistan women's national team.

Club career
In 2021, she moved to Turkey and signed with the re-established team Trabzonspor to play in the Turkish Women's Football Super League.

International career
Takaboeva capped for Uzbekistan at senior level in September 2019, during a 1–1 friendly draw against India and the Hope Cup.

See also
List of Uzbekistan women's international footballers

References 

2001 births
Living people
Uzbekistani women's footballers
Uzbekistan women's international footballers
Women's association football midfielders
People from Sirdaryo Region
Uzbekistani expatriate footballers
Expatriate women's footballers in Turkey
Trabzonspor women's players
Turkish Women's Football Super League players
Uzbekistani expatriate sportspeople in Turkey
21st-century Uzbekistani women